Sawai Raja Sur Singh Rathore or Suraj Mal or Suraj Singh (24 April 1571 – 7 September 1619), was the Raja of Marwar Kingdom (11 July 1595 – 7 September 1619).
His sister was the wife of Emperor Jahangir and mother of Shah Jahan.

Early life 
Suraj Mal, he was the son of Raja Udai Singh, the ruler of Marwar. His mother was Rajavat  Kachwahi Manrang Deviji, the principal wife of his father and daughter of Raja Askaran of Narwar, who was also briefly Raja of Amber before being ousted in favour of his uncle, Bharmal. He was the older full brother of Mani Bai, through whom he was the maternal uncle of Prince Khurram; and Kishan Singh, the founder of Kingdom of Kishangarh.

Reign 
Sur Singh succeeded his father upon his death, and he was given tilak by Akbar on 23 July 1595. Akbar bestowed upon him 16 parganas and a mansab of 2000 Zat and Sawar. 

He was sent to look into the affairs of Gujarat in the absence of Prince Murad who had left for Deccan. In 1597, a revolt broke out in Gujarat, and he was appointed to take the expedition against Bahadur, son of Muzaffar Gujrati. However Bahadur fled away the field without facing the besieging army. In 1599, he was sent to assist Daniyal Mirza in the conquest of the Deccan for Emperor Akbar. In 1604 on the request of Daniyal Mirza, he was allowed to return to Jodhpur and was granted Jaitaran and western half of Merta pargana. He received the hereditary title of Sawai Raja in recognition of his many services. 

Under the reign of Jahangir, in 1607 he was sent to put down the rebellion in Gujarat. On 1608, he attended the court of Jahangir and presented a poet who wrote verse in the Hindi language. Later that year, he was granted 3000 Zat and 2000 Sawar. In 1613, he was granted the pargana of Phalodi and was deputed by the Emperor along with Prince Khurram to undertake the expedition of Mewar. The local knowledge by the Raja fully utilised by Khurram against the Rana of Mewar and various outpost were established on his suggestion.  In 1615, he was promoted to rank of 5000 Zat and 3300 Sawar and was posted to Deccan to subdue the various rebelling vassals. At his departure, a robe of honour along with a horse was bestowed upon him.

Death 

He died on active service at Mahaikat, Deccan on 7 September 1619. 

On his death, the Emperor Jahangir had remarked:

According to Khyats, at the time of his death, Sur Singh's sway extended over Jodhpur, Siwana, Jaitaran, Jalor, Satalmar, Sojat, Merta, Phalodi, Sanchor, Terwada, Merwada, villages of Gorwada, Ratlam and Bhatnagar in Malwa, Chorgaon in Deccan and Radhanpur in Gujarat. 

He was succeeded by his son Gaj Singh.

Ancestry

References

See also
Rulers of Marwar

1571 births
1619 deaths
Monarchs of Marwar